Colyton is a town in Devon, England. It is located within the East Devon local authority area, the river River Coly runs through it. Its population in 1991 was 2,783, reducing to 2,105 at the 2011 Census. Colyton is a major part of the Coly Valley electoral ward. The ward population at the above census was 4,493.

Toponymy
Colyton is first recorded in 964 as Culintona. It is generally agreed to mean "farmstead by the River Coly".

History
Colyton first appeared as an ancient village around 700 AD and features in the Domesday Book as Culitone. The third code of law of King Edmund I was issued at Colyton in about 945. This helped to stabilize feudal society, by stating clearly its four pillars: kingship, lordship, family, and neighbourhood. It grew into an important agricultural centre and market town with a corn mill, saw mill, iron foundry and an oak bark tannery that is still functioning. Situated  to the north of the town was Colcombe Castle, now demolished, a former seat of the Courtenay family, Earls of Devon.

Following the attainder of the Marquis of Exeter the Courtenay lands escheated to the Crown, and those within Colyton were sold back for £1,000 to various residents of Colyton parish, as listed in a deed transcribed in the Letters and Papers of Henry VIII dated 6 January 1547, summarised as "John Clarke and others. Grant in free socage, subject to rents etc. (specified), for l,000l., of the following lands (extents given) in the parish of Colyton, which are parcels of Colyton manor, Devon, and belonged to Henry Marquis of Exeter, attainted".  This was the origin of the Feoffees of Colyton, who continued to hold in common various properties in the parish.

The town has been described as "the most rebellious town in Devon" due to the number of its inhabitants who joined the Monmouth Rebellion in 1685.

The church

The Church of England parish church of St Andrew's, is a Grade I listed building. A Saxon church occupied the site of St Andrew's until replaced by the present Norman church in the 11th century. The 14th century octagonal lantern tower is said to have been used as a beacon for ships on the once navigable River Axe, to the east, although there is doubt that the tower may be seen at all from the river. The nearby vicarage, Brerewood House, is a Grade II listed building from about 1529.

Other notable features

Colyton Grammar School dates from 1546 and once occupied the part-medieval building now known as the Old Church House. In 1927 it moved to Colyford, a small village within the Colyton parish. The school has made headlines in recent years as the first school to opt-out of local authority control and gain grant-maintained status and for achieving very high rankings in national examination league tables.

Seaton Tramway terminates at nearby Kingsdon on the other side of the River Coly. Colyton Station was opened in 1868 and was originally part of the Seaton Branch line, which connected Seaton, Colyford and Colyton with the main line at Seaton Junction. When the line closed in 1966, Modern Electric Tramways Ltd purchased the section between Seaton Riverside and Colyton, and Seaton Tramway was established in 1970. The line was extended in stages and Colyton was reached in 1980. The original station building has been restored and extended, and now houses the Tramway's ticket office, gift shop and Tram Stop Restaurant. The Tramway is open daily from Easter until the end of October, with a more limited service running at other times.

In 2018 the town made international news following an anonymous letter of complaint about a resident airing her laundry outside. The letter, claiming to be written "on behalf of local business", inspired other residents and businesses to hang underwear outside properties in the town in solidarity with the letter's recipient. In 2019 townsfolk held the first annual "Raising of the Pants" festival to commemorate the controversy.

The town is on the route of the East Devon Way footpath.

Transport

Bus service 885 serves Colyton on its route between Beer and Axminster via Seaton.

The Seaton Tramway also reaches Colyton, at the Colyton tram stop, although this is more tourism-based rather than regular transport.

Historic estates
Historic estates within the parish include:
Great House, seat of the Yonge family
Shute, seat of the Pole family
Colcombe Castle, seat of the Courtenays, Earls of Devon, later of the Poles of Shute

References

External links

Colyton Parish History Society

Towns in Devon
Civil parishes in Devon
East Devon District